Strictly Come Dancing aired its first series on BBC One from 15 May 2004. The series was presented by Bruce Forsyth and Tess Daly. The judging panel was Craig Revel Horwood, Arlene Phillips, Len Goodman and Bruno Tonioli.

On 3 July 2004, Natasha Kaplinsky and her partner, Brendan Cole were crowned series champions.

Couples
In the first series, there were eight celebrity contestants and in order of elimination, they were:

Scoring chart

Average chart
This table only counts for dances scored on a traditional 40-points scale.

Highest and lowest scoring performances of the series
The best and worst performances in each dance according to the judges' scores are as follows:

Couples' highest and lowest scoring dances

Weekly scores and songs 

Unless indicated otherwise, individual judges scores in the charts below are given (in parenthesis) in this order from left to right: Craig Revel Horwood, Arlene Phillips, Len Goodman, Bruno Tonioli.

Week 1

Individual judges scores in the chart below (given in parentheses) are listed in this order from left to right: Bruno Tonioli, Arlene Phillips, Len Goodman, Craig Revel Horwood.

Running order

Week 2

Running order

Week 3

This week's show is filmed in the Blackpool Tower Ballroom.

Running order

Week 4
Running order

Week 5
Running order

° This week featured the first 'ten' in Strictly history, awarded to Natasha & Brendan by Arlene.

Additionally, every couple participated in a group Viennese Waltz to Alicia Keys' "If I Ain't Got You". This was not scored.

Week 6: Quarter-final
Running order

Week 7: Semi-final
Running order

Week 8: Final
Running order

° This week featured the lowest scoring Showdance in Strictly history, performed by Christopher & Hanna.

Dance chart

 Highest scoring dance
 Lowest scoring dance

The dances performed during Series 1 were as follows:

Week 1: Cha Cha Cha or Waltz
Week 2: Quickstep or Rumba
Week 3: Tango or Jive
Week 4: Foxtrot or Paso Doble
Week 5: Samba and Viennese Waltz
Week 6 & 7: Two unlearned dances
Week 8: Favourite ballroom, favourite Latin & Showdance

BBC Interactive service

Series 1 also introduced the first interactive dance lessons hosted by Len Goodman. Each week on BBCi (red button), Freeview, the basics of each dances were demonstrated for beginners. The BBCi service also provided descriptions of how these dances are to be performed and to what style.

References

Season 01
2004 British television seasons